Soviet submarine U-359 (originally named S-174, and later known as RZS-359 and PZS-359 before arriving in Denmark) was a Soviet Whiskey-class submarine built in 1953 and in service until 1993. After decommissioning, it was acquired by a Danish project for unemployed youth interested in turning it into a cultural site and tourist attraction.

History
In 1991, a project for unemployed youth in Kolding, Denmark called The Rolling Gallery asked then Soviet President Mikhail Gorbachev to donate a submarine as a symbol of peace between the East and the West. The project proposed to use it as a cultural site and tourist attraction. Gorbachev agreed with the proposal, but it took three years and a payment of $110,000 to the Russian government before the vessel arrived in Kolding.

Residents were not happy with the having the submarine in the harbor, and after much debate and press coverage Kolding gave the submarine to the town of Nakskov in 1997. However, financial difficulties plagued the project and the plans for an experience center were not realized. The submarine fund attempted to move to Frederikshavn, but Nakskov would not cooperate. The sub served as a tourist attraction in Nakskov until 2010. In April 2011, it was towed to Fredrikshavn to be chopped up for scrap.

References

Bibliography
 

Whiskey-class submarines
Ships built in the Soviet Union
1953 ships
Cold War
Cold War submarines of the Soviet Union
Denmark–Soviet Union relations